The 2016 Adur District Council elections took place on 5 May 2016 to elect members of Adur District Council in West Sussex, England. Half of the council was up for election, and the Conservative Party remained in overall control of the council. The  Labour Party  trebled their number of seats from one to three.

After the election, the composition of the council was:
Conservative 16 (-4)
UKIP 8 (+2)
Labour 3 (+2)
Shoreham Beach Residents Association 2 (no change)

Results

Ward results

References

Adur District Council election
2016
Adur District Council election, 2016